Peter Malcolm may refer to:

 Peter Malcolm (rugby league) (active 1988), an Australian rugby league player
 Peter Malcolm (rugby union) (born 1994), an American rugby union player